The 1903 Syracuse Orangemen football team represented Syracuse University during the 1903 college football season.

Schedule

References

Syracuse
Syracuse Orange football seasons
Syracuse Orangemen football